Magik (Illyana Nikolaievna Rasputina) (Russian: Ильяна Николаевна Распутина) is a character appearing in American comic books published by Marvel Comics. The character is depicted most often in relation to the X-Men, and first appeared in the comic book Giant-Size X-Men #1 (May 1975).

Magik is the younger sister of the Russian X-Men member Colossus. She is a member of a fictional species of humanity known as mutants, who are born with superhuman abilities. Due to her time imprisoned in (and later ruling) Limbo, she is a powerful sorceress. Her mutant power, which first manifested in that Limbo, is the ability to teleport via stepping discs utilizing that dimension's magic.

Magik has been described as one of Marvel's most notable and powerful female heroes.

Anya Taylor-Joy portrayed Illyana Rasputin in the 2020 film The New Mutants.

Publication history
Illyana first appeared in Giant-Size X-Men #1 (May 1975), though her first name was not given until The Uncanny X-Men #145 (May 1981). For the first eight years of the character's existence, she was an infrequently appearing background character known as Colossus' little sister. The means of changing this was set in The Uncanny X-Men #160 (August 1982), in which she ages seven years while in a paranormal dimension called Limbo, becomes a sorceress, and develops the mutant ability to create "teleportation discs." These changes were not immediately explored or explained, and for the next year she remained essentially a background character.

In December 1983, the limited series Magik (Illyana and Storm) was launched, chronicling Illyana's years in Limbo, which is also her origin story. Magik #1 (Dec. 1983) is her first cover appearance as young Illyana, her second full appearance and the first time she get the name Magik. Magik #2 (Jan. 1984) is her first cover appearance as adult Magik. Immediately following the end of the series, she was added to the cast of the New Mutants, appearing regularly in that comic from The New Mutants #14 (April 1984), the first cover appearance of adult Magik in costume, to The New Mutants #77 (July 1989), in which she returns to her family in Russia after having reverted to childhood. As the younger sister of Colossus and a member of the New Mutants, she also sporadically appeared as a guest star in Uncanny X-Men.

In The Uncanny X-Men #303 (1993), she dies of the Legacy Virus. Other than flashbacks and alternate realities, she was absent from regular publication for most of the 1990s, though she does appear as a time-traveler in The New Mutants: Truth or Death #1-3 (1997). After being resurrected by Belasco, she returned to regular publication in 2007, in New X-Men #38-41 (2007), X-Infernus #1-4 (2009), X-Men: Hellbound #1-3 (2010) and New Mutants vol. 3 #1-29 (2009-2011). As a member of Cyclops' Extinction Team, she appears in The Uncanny X-Men vol. 2 #1-20 (2012), Avengers vs. X-Men #1-12 (2012), AVX: Versus #3 (2012), and AVX: Consequences #1-5 (2012). She appears in All-New X-Men, The Uncanny X-Men vol. 3, Extraordinary X-Men and The New Mutants: Dead Souls (2018) as a regular character. She appears in Strange Academy #1 (2020) as a teacher in Dr. Strange's Sorcerer School.

Fictional character biography
Illyana Rasputin (born Illyana Nikolaievna Rasputina) was born in the Ust-Ordynski Collective farm, near Lake Baikal, Siberia, Russian SFSR, Soviet Union to Nikolai Rasputin and his wife Alexandra Natalya Rasputina. Illyana's two older brothers, Mikhail Nikolaievitch Rasputin and Colossus (Piotr "Peter" Nikolaievitch Rasputin) are also mutants. Colossus' superhuman powers manifest while saving Illyana from a runaway tractor.

At six years old, Illyana is abducted and brought to the United States by Arcade, who uses her and several other hostages to coerce the X-Men into opposing Doctor Doom. She is rescued and brought back to the X-Mansion.

Shortly thereafter, Illyana is called to the Limbo dimension by Belasco, who seeks to bring forth the Elder Gods to rule Earth. She is raised there, frequently bullied and tormented by Belasco's underling S'ym. To free himself, Belasco needs to fill the Beatrix Medallion with five bloodstones. The bloodstones are created by corrupting Illyana's soul, with a new stone appearing as her corruption deepens. She is rescued and tutored in the practice of white magic by that dimension's version of Storm (who turned to magic when her mutant powers waned). Finding the use of magic abhorrent, Limbo's version of Shadowcat, known as Cat, kidnaps and trains Illyana in hand to hand and sword combat. Cat, along with Illyana, storms Belasco's citadel. They are overwhelmed by Belasco who further transforms Cat into a feline demonic creature. With Illyana back under his control, Belasco instructs her in the art of black magic in the hopes that it will further corrupt her soul. However, Illyana plots Belasco's defeat and continues to resist the dark influence on her soul. Illyana forms a mystical bond between both Storm and Cat, who were also tutored by Belasco.

Belasco succeeds in creating three parts of Illyana's bloodstone pendant. Illyana creates the Soulsword and takes over Limbo as its new ruler. While wielding the Soulsword she manifests horns, a tail and fangs. She banishes Belasco from Limbo and claims S'ym as her servant. She then returns to Earth a decade older, although no time has passed on Earth since her kidnapping. She subsequently joins the New Mutants.

Magik misguides one of her teleportation discs through the space-time continuum and strands herself and Mirage in ancient Egypt. There, Illyana meets Storm's ancestor Ashake, an Egyptian priestess. Together, they defeat an evil sorcerer, Heka-Nut, who sought an ancient mystical sword called the Sword of Bone using Magik's Soulsword. Ashake helps Illyana and Mirage return to the present, with Mirage's memory of the incident erased in the process.

A strange armor begins to appear on her body each time she wields the Soulsword. The armor appears only on one of her shoulders and arms at first, but appears on more of her body each time that she wields the sword. Illyana's skill as a sorceress grows, and she battles other beings with mystical powers such as Baba Yaga, the Enchantress, Forge, Spiral, and Heka-Nut. A routine trip through Limbo goes awry, leaving the New Mutants stuck in Limbo. To open an escape route for her teammates, Illyana embraces her demonic nature and opens a colossal teleportation disc between Earth and Limbo, which N'astirh holds open, triggering an invasion of Earth by demons from Limbo. Ashamed of herself, she flees into Limbo, and decides to end the demonic invasion by assuming rule of Limbo. However, her teammate Rahne Sinclair persuades her against this, and she instead gives up her demonic powers by creating a massive stepping disc that banishes the demons back to Limbo, then throws her Soulsword in after them to seal the portal shut. Afterwards, the New Mutants find a seven-year-old Illyana inside the husk of her eldritch armor. She still possesses the bloodstone locket.

Because of the mystic bond she shares with the Shadowcat from the Limbo dimension, the Soulsword passes on to Earth's Shadowcat in England. It embeds itself in a stone near Excalibur's lighthouse headquarters, waiting for Shadowcat to claim it and become its new wielder. After a conflict with the necromancer Gravemoss, the Soulsword is acquired by Amanda Sefton, who would claim Illyana's mantle as Magik, ruler of Limbo and wielder of the Soulsword.

Illyana returns to Russia where she lives with her parents for some months until they are murdered by the Russian government to secure Illyana's abilities to defeat a psionic being known as the Soul Skinner. Illyana then returns to the X-Mansion to live with her brother and the other X-Men.

Not long afterwards, Illyana contracts the Legacy Virus, and dies in the X-Mansion, despite all efforts to save her made by Charles Xavier and Moira MacTaggert.

Illyana's spirit returns to Colossus, who had recently returned to the United States with Shadowcat and Nightcrawler following the disbanding of Excalibur. When investigating odd occurrences inside the Mansion, Colossus locates one of the stepping disks that Illyana had magically bound to the school. He is transported to a pocket world, which holds a memory imprint of Illyana. Illyana's memory convinces him to make one final sacrifice. When the cure for the Legacy Virus turned out to need the death of one mutant, he secretly gave his life, so nobody else would have to die like Illyana did. Colossus is later resurrected by an alien race.

Belasco eventually deposes Amanda Sefton and, after seeing Illyana reappear during the 2005 "House of M" and realizing he carries a torch for her, creates a powerful spell to return her to him. The spell pulls forth the remaining essence of Illyana still held within Limbo's dimension, taking shape as the Darkchilde, the semi-demonic version of Illyana corrupted and transformed by dark magic. Belasco is not satisfied with his creation, claiming that it is not the true Illyana Rasputin (due to her lack of Illyana's soul) and banishes her to the outer parts of Limbo.

Illyana, now with her Darkchilde persona, discovers some of the teenage New X-Men being attacked by a horde of demons. After aiding the mutants against the demons, she uses a spell to immobilize them and steal a portion of Pixie's soul, in the hopes of creating both a bloodstone and a new Soulsword, as Illyana felt Pixie had the most innocent of souls present. Anole breaks free from Illyana's confinement and dispatches her. Pixie's soul extraction is partially successful however, creating one part of a bloodstone pendant and a soul dagger. Illyana attempts to complete the process and destroy those who wished to interfere, but Rockslide thwarts her, and causes Illyana's human memories of her friends and life among the X-Men to return to her.

Although only a part of Pixie's soul was taken, Pixie is now capable of performing magic, the hole in her soul having been filled with black magic. Since Belasco had sealed his castle from her own magic and powers, Illyana teaches Pixie a teleportation spell, with which the New X-Men attack and defeat Belasco.

Illyana succumbs to her Darkchilde persona and announces her desire to create several more bloodstones to become god-like in power. She is interrupted by the arrival of Colossus, investigating Illyana's apparent return to life. A pained Illyana rejects her brother's offers of help, and sends everyone back to Earth, before reclaiming Limbo's throne and informing S'ym and N'astirh, now once more her servants, that her next move is to reclaim her soul. Motivated by her friendship with Shadowcat and love for Colossus, Illyana tries to reclaim her soul through love and teleports to the Xavier Institute, only to find it destroyed and abandoned.

While in Limbo, Illyana attacks various demons in her search for the Bloodstone amulet. Her activities are noticed by Mephisto, Blackheart, Satannish, Dormammu and Hela. Belasco's daughter, Witchfire appears during the meeting and reveals she is the current owner of Illyana's Bloodstone amulet and vows to take her father's place as ruler of Limbo. Back at the X-Men's base in San Francisco, Pixie accidentally discovers Magik's Soulsword is hidden inside Nightcrawler. Sensing its presence, Illyana teleports in and reclaims her sword, transforming from the Darkchilde into her Magik persona. She strikes Colossus when he enters the Danger Room and calls out to her, realizing that something is wrong when she does not feel any emotions, and returns to Limbo. Witchfire has conquered Limbo and Magik's armies during her absence. Claiming everything that Belasco ever owned, Witchfire captures Magik, takes her bloodstone and adds it to the amulet.

The X-Men arrive at the castle; Nightcrawler finds Illyana chained to a pillar. At her direction, he stabs her with Pixie's soul dagger, re-releasing the Soulsword inside of her. Witchfire completes the set of Bloodstones via another portion of Pixie's soul and releases the Elder Gods. Illyana and the other mutants hold back Witchfire and the Elder Gods. Using a combination of magic and the powers of the Soulsword and Souldagger, Illyana and Pixie remove one of Pixie's bloodstones. The Elder Gods are swept back to their dimension, along with Witchfire and the remaining bloodstones. Pixie's Souldagger merges with the bloodstone that was pried loose by Ilyana. Saddened by the loss of her and Pixie's remaining bloodstones, Illyana teleports the mutants back to the X-Base, and they convince her to stay with them.

However, the younger mutants are still very distrustful of her. Illyana seems to have undergone a personality change since her return from the future, becoming more detached emotionally in most cases, possibly due to the further loss of most of her soul.

Later, Cyclops sends Illyana to team up (unknowingly) with X-Force to locate Wolverine and teleport them to Alcatraz to rescue any mutants taken prisoner by Norman Osborn's forces. Along with Pixie, they teleport all the X-Men from San Francisco to their new home, Utopia.

When Hope Summers and Cable return to the present during the 2010 "X-Men: Second Coming" storyline, Bastion begins eliminating all mutant teleporters to trap the mutant population on Utopia. While trying to bring Hope and Cable to Utopia, Illyana is fired upon by one of the Purifiers with a supernatural weapon that opens a portal to Limbo that she cannot control; she is drawn into the portal by a cluster of demonic tentacles. She is eventually freed from her restraints by Pixie, and Illyana and her rescue team return to Earth.

In a reversal of fortune, Pixie is kidnapped by Project Purgatory, and Magik returns to Limbo with the New Mutants to rescue her. While in Limbo, the New Mutants encounter the Inferno Babies - mutants who were taken as infants by the government and raised and trained in Limbo. This now-adult team attacks and overwhelms the New Mutants. While the rest of the team is captured, Magik escapes to Earth with Karma and Pixie. After hiding the Soulsword inside Karma, Magik teleports the rest of the X-Men to Portal Epsilon, Project Purgatory's gateway to Limbo, for what the X-Men believe to be a rescue mission. They arrive just as Limbo's Elder Gods breach the gateway to Earth. Karma releases Legion's mind with the soulsword, freeing him to use his powers to destroy the Elder Gods and return the bloodstones belonging to Magik and Pixie, thus restoring their souls. Confronted by Cyclops afterward, Magik admits to putting the world in danger and manipulating the X-Men for the sake of a personal vendetta against the Elder Gods. Cyclops decides that she must be restrained. While she remains unrepentant, she accepts his decision.

Magik is placed in the X-Brig 2, a newly constructed, ultra-high security prison 500 ft. below sea level. She is controlled by devices that detect and prevent the use of teleportation and magic. During a visit Magik accepts the blame for her incarceration when Colossus tries to comfort her. Magik is temporarily released by Colossus and Kitty to get her help in defeating Juggernaut.

Following the events of Schism, Magik is selected to be a member of Cyclops' "Extinction Team." Despite this status, she remains a prisoner. She is only released from the X-Brig for missions, and while in the field, her suit contains lethal fail-safes that prevent her escape.

Illyana is chosen as one of the "Phoenix Five," a group of X-Men granted additional powers by the Phoenix Force. After Ms. Marvel is defeated by Rogue, Magik appears and gags the Avenger before teleporting her into Limbo, trapping her and terrifying Rogue. Following the defeat of Cyclops, Magik and the other former members of the Phoenix Five are reported to have fled. Magik joins Cyclops' team of X-Men at the New Xavier School at the old Weapon X facility. The Phoenix apparently has damaged Magik's powers, like it apparently did to the other five; Illyana initially thinks her ability to channel increased energies from Limbo is a power upgrade, but Dormmamu pulls her into Limbo, and demonstrates that her newfound ability to effortlessly summon Limbo energies is destroying Limbo. Dormmamu later pulls the entire Uncanny team into Limbo, intending to kill them in front of Magik before he kills her. They fight back and Illyana absorbs all of Limbo's mystic energy, causing it and its creatures to disappear. She sends the X-Men back to Earth, and travels back through time to become the protégé of a past version of Doctor Strange, explaining that she needs a greater understanding of magic, so as to better control her mutant powers.

It is eventually discovered that Magik along with Cyclops, Emma Frost, Magneto and Colossus were actually infected with nano-sentinels by Dark Beast, after the incident with the Phoenix Force, and that was the real cause for their broken powers or sudden upgrade. She has since regained total control over her powers and was able to recreate Limbo.

She later helps Doctor Strange defeat the Empirikul, a science cult focused on destroying magic in every dimension.

Magik is employed by Karma to lead a new New Mutants team along with Wolfsbane, Rictor, Strong Guy, Prodigy and Boom-Boom.

When an eco-terrorist group attempted to use the Man-Thing as a weapon against humanity, the part of Ted Sallis within the creature attempted to stop the threat by summoning the demon lord Belasco, who he had previously made a deal with to gain the insight necessary to crack the super-soldier serum. Instead, this ritual summoned Illyana, who offered to release Sallis from the Man-Thing with the warning that this would leave Man-Thing a creature of instinct who could endanger the world. Sallis accepted that he had to remain in Man-Thing, but Illyana not only helped stop the group that had unleashed Man-Thing as a weapon, but later summoned Belasco so that Sallis could punish the demon for his role in Sallis's fall.

Dawn of X
After the formation of the mutant sovereign state of Krakoa, Magik is granted the rank of Captain in the Quiet Council. She joins Sunspot and the other New Mutants in travelling to Shi'ar space, aboard the Starjammers vessel, to locate Sunspot's best friend Cannonball.  Magik and the rest of the New Mutants are arrested once the Starjammers arrive at a space station to rob a highly valued object, having been believed to be behind the attempted thievery. The New Mutants are quickly bailed out by Cannonball's wife, Smasher, under the order that they are to protect Deathbird in transit to the Shi'ar homeworld to instruct her niece in the way of rule.

Powers and abilities

Teleportation
Magik has the mutant ability to teleport herself and others through time and space from one location to another.  She initially did this by summoning what she calls "stepping discs," which were part of a dimension known as Limbo. Claremont wrote dialogue for Kitty Pryde that identified Magik's powers with science fiction author Larry Niven's stepping disks, a concept that first appeared in his 1970 novel Ringworld.

When Illyana called for a stepping disc she had to use Limbo as a midway point before she could teleport to an alternate location. Magik has succeeded in teleporting herself across continents, from one continent to another, and even interplanetary and intergalactic distances on occasion.

Unlike most teleporters in the Marvel Universe, Magik can teleport through time as well as space. She has teleported moments, days or centuries into the past or future. Especially early on, she had difficulty modulating this ability and would often inadvertently travel through time and space when intending to teleport only through space. The greater the distance over which she teleported, the greater the possible margin of error in terms of her arriving at the point of time she intended.

After Illyana absorbed all of Limbo, the stepping discs ceased to exist; now when Illyana teleports, hellish images of ghosts, dragons, or other supernatural creatures appear.

Sorcery
Magik is the sorceress supreme of her Limbo dimension.

In Limbo, Magik is able to cast any magic spell that Belasco could, having had access to his store of sorcerous knowledge. Her sorcery is a unique mix of black magic that she learned from Belasco and white magic she was taught by an alternative-reality Ororo Munroe.

On Earth, her magic was limited to astral projection, sensing mystical presences, scrying, and casting very simple spells. In X-Infernus, she uses magic of a seemingly greater strength than she could previously use in Earth's dimension. Since absorbing Limbo and becoming Doctor Strange's disciple, Illyana's magic on Earth has been considerably stronger, such as when she used spells she learned from Doctor Strange to destroy advanced Sentinels.

Eldritch armor

The more Magik uses her magical power, the more mystical armor appears on her body, in addition to demonic features such as horns and hooves. The armor deflects or limits attacks, both physical and magical. Illyana's armor also provides protection from the Transmode Virus. The armor also provides Illyana with super-strength, which she displayed by being able to toss the giant demon S'ym off of her several feet.

Soulsword
The Soulsword was created by Illyana Rasputin during her imprisonment in Limbo. Illyana magically caused her own life force energy to manifest before her. Once this happened she cast her hand into a pool of eldritch energy and imagined a weapon in her mind. When she withdrew her hand she was holding the Soulsword, created from her own soul. A simple looking blade upon its origin, it develops intricate designs and forms upon itself the more Illyana uses it, becoming more powerful with each use.

Magik's Soulsword disrupts magical energies, constructs, and creatures. It also augments the power level of any magic user who holds it. The Soulsword generally has no physical effect, but disrupts even the most powerful magic as it passes through. Since Illyana's resurrection, the Soulsword seems to affect psychic beings like Legion's personalities, whereas in the past the sword only affected magical creatures and spells. The only exception to this has been Kitty Pryde, who can still be cut by the Soulsword even when Pryde is using her phasing power to become intangible. Illyana can make her Soulsword appear and vanish at will. After Avengers vs. X-Men, Illyana has used her Soulsword against physical beings, including a Sentinel.

Other abilities
Illyana has formidable psionic shields, which block anyone from reading her mind, even such powerful telepaths as Professor X, the Shadow King, and Rachel Summers. Since her revival, Illyana is able to lower her psionic shields.

Due to Belasco creating the magical bloodstones with their souls, Illyana has a psychic bond with X-Man Kitty Pryde. Because of this, a similar connection could be considered between Illyana and Storm.

Collection
 After being out-of-print for a few decades, the series was collected as a hardcover graphic novel titled X-Men - Magik: Storm & Illyana and released in Dec. 2008.

Reception

Critical reception 
Sara Century of Syfy referred to Magik as "one of the X-Men's most surprisingly popular characters," asserting, "Illyana's story often involves her teetering on the edge between good and evil. She is a character who has been forced to make no-win choices since her early childhood, and those decisions have gone on to define much of her arc. However, Illyana is also a brave, dynamic character whose hope was crushed out of her by a much older man when she was only a child. The trauma she underwent is extreme, even by X-Men standards. Though she finds her ability to hope has been crushed, Illyana's saving grace is that she does everything in her power to keep her friends safe from harm. No longer trusting herself, she surrounds herself with good people and puts her faith in them, instead. For anyone who has been made to feel like a lesser person for the abuse they've undergone, Illyana is a surprisingly poignant character. Her continuous struggle against her evil impulses might not always work out to everyone's advantage, but the fact that she continues to try even when all hope seems to be lost is still inspirational." David Harth of CBR.com labelled Magik as "Marvel's best magic user," stating, "Some Marvel heroes are vastly underrated and are deserving of more attention and time in the spotlight. Marvel's heroes run the gamut from the amazingly powerful to non-superpowered vigilantes. For years, the A-list heroes have fronted books and teams, their names becoming a part of the pantheon of greatest superheroes of all times. However, there are plenty of heroes out there who never got the chance to shine. These underrated heroes have vocal fans and are always on the cusp of stardom. [...] Magik has a long and storied history. A member of the powerful Rasputin family, Magik's teleportational abilities allow her to travel through space and time, but it's her magic powers that have made her so formidable. She's conquered the magical realm of Limbo and is a fearless combatant. She looks great, with her anime-inspired costume and giant swords making her a memorable visual. The magic side of Marvel is pretty much just her, Doctor Strange, and Scarlet Witch, and she's a more fun character than either of them. Magik has got it all: she's powerful, entertaining, looks cool, and can handle herself in battles against supervillains, demons, and dark gods." Alex Schlesinger of Screen Rant wrote, "The powerful mutant Magik, sister of the long time X-Men member Colossus, has not only seen a meteoric rise to fame over the past decade, but also has the best long-term character arc of any hero in Marvel Comics. First introduced in 1975's Giant-Size X-Men #1 as the young, unnamed sister of Piotr Rasputin, Illyana was eventually kidnapped and brought to America by the villain Arcade before she was taken to the realm of Limbo by the evil demon lord Belasco. Since then Magik has dealt with the trauma she experienced at the hands of Belasco and his henchman S'ym in Limbo, losing her soul, and becoming the Queen of Limbo. [...] Magik's story powerfully shows that trauma is not necessary for growth or empowerment, but one can also not undo the trauma of their past. Instead, the path forward is to reconcile your past with your present and gain strength from the freedom you have desperately fought for. Magik's story of heroic redemption, escape from abuse, and acceptance of one's identity has given this X-Men fan-favorite the best character arc in Marvel Comics." Michileen Martin of Looper said, "Illyana Rasputin, aka Magik, isn't quite like her New Mutants teammates. Yeah, she's a mutant, but her teleportation powers are just the beginning of her extraordinary abilities. Illyana is the earliest New Mutant to appear in the X-Men comics, showing up seven years before the New Mutants original graphic novel that introduced the team to readers. She's part-demon queen, a powerful sorceress, sister to a classic X-Men hero, and a star of 2020's superhero/horror hybrid The New Mutants. Plus, of the classic New Mutants line-up, she's proven the most willing to commit the kind of dark acts most superheroes shun. Over the years, Illyana has become a staple of the New Mutants. While not a founding member, once she joins, she's one of its most powerful assets and later proves an equally irreplaceable member of the X-Men. Unfortunately, the mystical origins of Illyana's powers occasionally threaten to make her a liability, as she's got a demonic dark half that's dangerously easy to corrupt. With both mutant and magical abilities, Illyana is a fascinating character."

Accolades 

 In 2014, BuzzFeed ranked Magik 12th in their "95 X-Men Members Ranked From Worst To Best" list.
 In 2015, Entertainment Weekly ranked Magik 33rd in their "Let's rank every X-Man ever" list.
 In 2018, CBR.com ranked Magik 11th in their "16 Most Powerful Marvel Magic Users" list and 7th in their "20 Most Powerful Mutants From The '80s" list.
 In 2019, Sideshow included Magik in their "Marvel's Most Masterful Witches" list. 
 In 2019, CBR.com ranked Magik 1st in their "10 Best New Mutants Who Graduated To Become X-Men" list and included her in their "Marvel's Most Powerful New Mutants" list. 
 In 2020, Scary Mommy included Magik in their "Looking For A Role Model? These 195+ Marvel Female Characters Are Truly Heroic" list.
 In 2020, CBR.com ranked Magik 1st in their "New Mutants: Every Member Of The Original Team" list, 7th in their "Marvel Comics: The Strongest Magic Users" list, and 4th in their "10 Most Powerful Teleporters In The Marvel Universe" list.
 In 2021, Screen Rant ranked Magik 1st in their "10 Most Powerful Members Of The New Mutants" list.
 In 2021, Looper included Magik in their "Marvel's Most Powerful Magic Users" list.
 In 2022, Sportskeeda ranked Magik 3rd in their "5 most powerful comic characters with magic abilities" list.
 In 2022, Screen Rant included Magik in their "10 Most Powerful X-Men" list and in their "15 Most Powerful Marvel Magic Users (Who Aren't Doctor Strange)" list.
 In 2022, CBR.com ranked Magik 3rd in both their "10 Greatest X-Men, Ranked By Courage" list and "15 Alpha-Level Mutants Who Are Deceptively Powerful" list.

Literary reception

Volumes

X-Men: Return of Magik - 2008 
According to Marvel Comics, X-Men: Return of Magik #1 sold out in September 2008. According to Diamond Comic Distributors, X-Men: Return of Magik #1 was the 128th best selling comic book in September 2008.

What If? Magik - 2018 
According to Diamond Comic Distributors, What If Magik #1 was the 115th best selling comic book in October 2018.

Matt Lune of CBR.com asserted, "Sometimes there are issues of What If that are so outrageous, they'd never be possible in the regular canon. Other stories, however, take already established plotlines and give them a little tweak, then show us the Butterfly Effect that this small change causes. What If Magik #1 definitely falls into the latter category, giving us a look at the life of Illyana Rasputin had she walked away from the New Mutants at a pivotal moment. [...] There's so much to enjoy in this issue that it's a shame that it's out of continuity. Williams does an excellent job of using the somewhat reluctant pairing to enrich and deepen both central characters in a way that seems almost wasted in this one-off issue. If it weren't for the fact that this early time in Magik's life was already fully explored by Claremont, this would make a perfect retcon flashback that could set up a future relationship between Illyana and Strange. As it stands, this is an effective examination of the two characters in a way that manages to find new things to say about both of them." Jamie Lovett of Comicbook.com gave What If? Magik #1 a grade of 5 out of 5, saying, "What If? Magik packs a novel's worth of story into a single comic book. Leah Williams and Felipe Andrade use Magik's history to tell a story of trauma, abusive relationships, and the road to recovery and reclamation and it is exquisitely told. Williams knows exactly when to zoom into a moment with personal dialogue and when to zoom out to let the narration carry the reader. Andrade does a great job of building his layouts around the dialogue and narration. Both Williams writing and Andrade's artwork present strong characterizations of Magik and Doctor Strange. There are two small quibbles, however. Andrade's expressive faces sometimes verge on the cartoonish, which is at odds with the tone of the story. The issue also begs for one last splash page to really drive home just how far Illyanna has come by the end. Regardless, this is an expertly crafted single-issue tale." Alan Kistler of Polygon included What If Magik #1 in their "The greatest What If...? stories in Marvel history" list.

Other versions

Age of Apocalypse
In the Age of Apocalypse timeline, after Apocalypse's attacks on Russia, her friends and family believed that Illyana had died when in fact she was taken to the slave camp known as the Core located in Seattle, which provides energy for Apocalypse's empire. Colossus, Shadowcat and Generation NeXt rescue her, at the cost of the lives of every single member of Generation NeXt. Illyana then helps Bishop go back in time to prevent the Age of Apocalypse from occurring in the mainstream Earth-616 timeline. In the 2000 Blink limited series, it is revealed via flashback that Sugar Man was at one point the abusive jailer in charge of cellmates Illyana Rasputin and Blink (before she was rescued as a young girl by Weapon-X and Sabretooth) in a prison facility.

Excalibur
During Excalibur'''s "Cross-Time Caper" storyline, the team encounters a childlike version of Illyana, clothed in the regalia of Doctor Strange, who runs an organized crime cartel in partnership with her friend Shadowcat. When Alistaire Stuart and a near comatose Rachel Summers are threatened by the authorities, Illyana grants them sanctuary; however, she merely intends to use her guests in a bid for dominance over the world. When the authorities once more attempt to search Illyana's apartment, an altercation occurs and she is shot dead but merely resurrects into her fully demonic form. That world's Captain Britain and Psylocke arrive on the scene to help stop Illyana. Psylocke psychically restores Phoenix, who performs an exorcism on Illyana and restores her to her human state.

Exiles
Illyana from Earth-4210 is also a member of The Exiles. Illyana replaces Blink when the Timebroker sends her home. She is led to believe that had she not become an Exile, she would murder her family. This universe's Magik is much more temperamental and ruthless than the Earth-616 Magik and clashes with the team from the beginning. Shortly after the Timebroker returns Blink to the team, he decrees that half the members of the combined Exiles and Weapon X group have to die. Fearing for her life, Magik tries to join King Hyperion and tells him of the mission Exiles and Weapon X were given. To corroborate her claims, Hyperion snaps Magik's neck to see if a replacement Exile is sent.

House of M
Not a true alternate earth as such, House of M is a temporary recreation of Earth-616 by the Scarlet Witch in which mutants are dominant on Earth. Magik is a member of a S.H.I.E.L.D. squadron of young mutants called the Hellions. Like most of the other Hellions, she eventually joins the side of the New Mutants, a team being groomed as future leaders, in fighting the establishment of the House of M in Japan. This version of Magik teleports to Limbo before the Scarlet Witch restores reality to its former state. This results in Belasco's resurrection of Illyana in Earth-616. In this reality, she can speak Japanese.

Shattershot
In the Shattershot crossover, a reality was shown in which Illyana was regressed in the same way as in Earth-616 but never succumbs to the Legacy Virus. She grows up to master her mutant and mystical powers, calls herself Darkchild and joins X-Force alongside Sunspot and Cannonball.

Other
In another reality in which Illyana is an adult, her son is trapped in an incorporeal form. She makes a deal with Mephisto to provide him with a body, at the cost of all mutants' lives, but her son ultimately rejects the offer.

What If?
 In "What If? the X-Men Had Stayed In Asgard?" Illyana is one of the New Mutants who chooses to remain in the Realm Eternal. She eventually replaces the Enchantress as Asgard's supreme sorceress and assumes a secondary role as liaison between her teammate Danielle Moonstar, the new ruler of Hel, and Asgard.
 In a 2006 issue of What If...?, Magik is a member of a Soviet version of the Fantastic Four known as "The Ultimate Federalist Freedom Fighters."
 In a 2018 issue of What If? Magik Became Sorcerer Supreme? envisions Illyana as recently freed from Limbo seven years older and wanting nothing to do with the X-Men and runs away before coming to the attention of Doctor Strange.

In other media
Television
 Illyana Rasputin makes a non-speaking cameo appearance in the X-Men: The Animated Series episode "Red Dawn". Additionally, a possible future version appears in the episode "Time Fugitives" as part of a vision that Cable has.
 At Comic Con 2009, Magik was one of several character design sketches shown for Wolverine and the X-Men.

Film
Illyana Rasputin / Magik appears in The New Mutants, portrayed by Anya Taylor-Joy as a young adult and Colbi Gannett as a child. This version was sold into child slavery, is at odds with terrifying creatures called the Smiling Men, and is accompanied by Lockheed.

Video games
 Illyana Rasputin appears as a non-playable character (NPC) in X-Men Legends, voiced by Jeannie Elias.
 Magik appears as an unlockable character in Marvel: Avengers Alliance.
 Magik appears as a playable character in Marvel Heroes, voiced by Tara Strong.
 Magik appears as a playable character in Marvel Contest of Champions.
 Magik appears as a playable character in Marvel Future Fight.
 Magik appears as a playable character in Marvel Puzzle Quest.
 Magik appears as a playable character in Marvel Future Revolution.
 Magik appears as a playable character in Marvel's Midnight Suns. This version is a graduate of the Xavier Academy, former member of the X-Men, the ruler of Limbo, and a member of the titular Midnight Suns.
 Magik appears in Marvel Snap''.

References

External links
 
 UncannyXmen.net spotlight on Illyana Nikolievna Rasputin
 Marvel Directory entry on Illyana Nikolievna Rasputin
 Sorceress Supreme - an Illyana Rasputin fan site
 

Characters created by Dave Cockrum
Characters created by Len Wein
Comics characters introduced in 1975
Fictional characters with evocation or summoning abilities
Fictional energy swordfighters
Fictional female swordfighters
Fictional Russian people
Fictional Soviet people
Fictional swordfighters in comics
Fictional women soldiers and warriors
Marvel Comics characters who can teleport
Marvel Comics characters who use magic
Marvel Comics demons
Marvel Comics female superheroes
Marvel Comics mutants
Marvel Comics superheroes
Marvel Comics witches
New Mutants
Superhero film characters
X-Men supporting characters